Les Bleues may refer to:

 France women's national basketball team
 France women's national football team
 France women's national handball team
 France women's national rugby union team

See also 

 Les Bleus (disambiguation)